Thomas Manning was a Tudor Prior and Bishop.

Life
Elected Prior of Butley, Suffolk in 1528, and Suffragan Bishop of Ipswich in 1536, he had to surrender these offices in 1538 having fallen foul of Thomas Cromwell; after which he was appointed Master of Mettingham College. His will dated 1545, and proved 1546, indicates that his wife pre-deceased him.

References

People from Suffolk Coastal (district)
16th-century English bishops
Bishops of Ipswich